Michael Torckler (born 12 April 1987) is a New Zealand cyclist, who currently rides for New Zealand amateur team GD Pringle p/b Spoken Cycles.

Career
During 2012, Torckler was staying at Santa Rosa, California to train for upcoming competitions. On one of his training rides, on 30 June, he was hit by a car coming around a bend. He was thrown off his bike and hit the car windshield, breaking his arm and almost killing him.

The driver fled the scene but was later caught and was sentenced to 10 years and four months in prison. Meanwhile, Torckler was airlifted to the nearest hospital, where he arrived in critical condition, close to death. Although he was not brain damaged from the accident, he had no recollection of the accident. He was immediately moved to intensive care, and was discharged after only 12 days.

After returning to New Zealand after only a month after his accident, Torckler was back on his bike and starting to train again. After four months, he returned to racing at the 2012 Tour of Southland and finished the race in 61st place. Known as 'King of the Comebacks', Torckler raced in the Tour of Utah, and even won the King of the Mountains title.

In November 2014 Torckler was announced as part of the Team Budget Forklifts line-up for 2015.

Major results

2005
 5th Road race, Oceania Under-23 Road Championships
2009
 1st  Time trial, National Under-23 Road Championships
 2nd Overall Vuelta a la Montaña Central de Asturias
 6th Overall Tour of Wellington
2010
 1st Overall Tour of Wellington
1st Stage 2
 1st Overall San Martin Proba de Ataun
 1st Overall Clásica Ciudad de Torredonjimeno
2012
 1st Overall Tour of Borneo
1st Points classification
1st Stage 1
 8th Overall Jelajah Malaysia
2013
 1st  Mountains classification Tour of Utah
 4th Overall New Zealand Cycle Classic
2015
 3rd The REV Classic
2016
 6th Overall New Zealand Cycle Classic
2017
 10th Overall New Zealand Cycle Classic
2018
 2nd Gravel and Tar
 3rd Road race, National Road Championships
 9th Overall New Zealand Cycle Classic
2019
 7th Overall New Zealand Cycle Classic
2021
 2nd Road race, National Road Championships

References

External links

CyclingQuotes.com article about Torckler

1987 births
Living people
New Zealand male cyclists